Kirchberg in Tirol is a municipality in the Austrian state of Tyrol in the Kitzbühel district. It is located 6 km (4 mi.) west of Kitzbühel.

Population

Panorama

References

External links 

 Pictures and information on Kirchberg in Tirol
 Travel info for Kirchberg in Tirol
 Kirchberg Gigapixel Panorama (6.000 Megapixel)

Kitzbühel Alps
Cities and towns in Kitzbühel District